A senatorial election was held on November 8, 1971 in the Philippines. The opposition Liberal Party won five seats in the Philippine Senate while three seats were won by the Nacionalista Party, the administration party; this was seen as a consequence of the Plaza Miranda bombing on August 21, 1971, which wounded all of the Liberal Party's candidates and almost took the lives of John Henry Osmeña and Jovito Salonga. Their terms as senators were cut short as a result of the declaration of martial law by President Ferdinand Marcos on September 23, 1972.

Due to the ratification of a new constitution in 1973, the Senate was abolished and the unicameral parliamentary Batasang Pambansa was instituted. In 1987, a new constitution was approved that reverted to the presidential and bicameral legislative system. This means that this would be the last election for the Senate until the 1987 election.

Retiring incumbents

Liberal Party 

 Sergio Osmeña Jr.

Nacionalista Party 

 Wenceslao Lagumbay

Nationalist Citizens' Party 

 Lorenzo Tañada

Results
The Liberal Party won five seats, while the Nacionalista Party won three.

Two Liberal incumbents successfully defended their seats: Genaro Magsaysay and Jovito Salonga, while Alejandro Almendras and Eva Estrada Kalaw of the Nacionalistas successfully defended their seats, as well.

The other four winners are neophyte senators: Eddie Ilarde, Ramon Mitra Jr., and John Henry Osmeña of the Liberals, and Ernesto Maceda of the Nacionalistas.

Nacionalista Senator Dominador Aytona lost his reelection bid.

Key:
 ‡ Seats up
 + Gained by a party from another party
 √ Held by the incumbent
 * Held by the same party with a new senator

Per candidate

Per party

See also
Commission on Elections
7th Congress of the Philippines

References

External links
 Official website of the Commission on Elections

1971
1971 elections in the Philippines